Wierzchowiny may refer to the following places:
Wierzchowiny, Krasnystaw County in Lublin Voivodeship (east Poland)
Wierzchowiny, Radzyń Podlaski County in Lublin Voivodeship (east Poland)
Wierzchowiny, Parczew County in Lublin Voivodeship (east Poland)
Wierzchowiny, Zamość County in Lublin Voivodeship (east Poland)
Wierzchowiny, Subcarpathian Voivodeship (south-east Poland)
Wierzchowiny, Masovian Voivodeship (east-central Poland)